Michael Anthony Robinson (born 30 October 1968) is an English former footballer who played as a full back in the Football League for Darlington.

He was on the books of Newcastle United without playing for their first team, and joined Darlington of the Football League Fourth Division in July 1988. He made three senior appearances. The first was as a substitute on the opening day of the 1988–89 Football League season in a 4–1 defeat at home to Stockport County. He started the next match, against Doncaster Rovers in the League Cup, and his third and final outing was in January 1989 as Darlington were eliminated by Halifax Town in the Associate Members' Cup.

References

1968 births
Living people
Footballers from Sunderland
English footballers
Association football defenders
Newcastle United F.C. players
Darlington F.C. players
English Football League players